Tansley is a civil parish in the Derbyshire Dales district of Derbyshire, England. The parish contains eleven listed buildings that are recorded in the National Heritage List for England.  Of these, one is listed at Grade II*, the middle of the three grades, and the others are at Grade II, the lowest grade.  The parish contains the village of Tansley and the surrounding area.  Most of the listed buildings are houses, cottages, farmhouses and farm buildings, and the others are two former textile mills and a public house.

Key

Buildings

References

Citations

Sources

 

Lists of listed buildings in Derbyshire